Jose Cruz may refer to:
 José Cruz (born 1947), baseball player
 José Cruz (pitcher), baseball player
 Jose B. Cruz Jr., Filipino mathematician
 José de la Cruz (1746–1829), Filipino writer
 José Cruz (Honduran footballer) (born 1949), Honduran footballer
 Camarón de la Isla (1950–1992), stage name of José Monje Cruz
 José Luis Cruz Cruz (born 1959), Puerto Rican politician and mayor of Trujillo Alto
 José Cruz Jr. (born 1974), baseball player 
 José E. Cruz (born 1984), baseball player with the Spanish national team
 José Cruz (Spanish footballer) (born 1988), Spanish footballer
 José da Cruz Cardinal Policarpo (1936–2014)
Jose Cruz (Oklahoma politician), member of the Oklahoma House of Representatives

See also
 José Guadalupe Cruz (disambiguation)
 José Santa Cruz (disambiguation)